The name Carla was used for 2 tropical cyclones in the Atlantic Ocean.
 Tropical Storm Carla (1956), produced gale-force winds over New England
 Hurricane Carla (1961), second most intense storm to ever strike the Texas coast; caused over $2 billion (2005 US dollars) in damages

The name Carla has been used for 6 tropical cyclones in the western north Pacific Ocean.
 Typhoon Carla (1962) (65W), landfall on Hainan Island; at least 13 people were killed
 Typhoon Carla (1965) (10W, Gloring)
 Typhoon Carla (1967) (29W, Trining), hit Taiwan, showering record rainfall amounts on the island, killing 69 people
 Tropical Storm Carla (1971) (7W, Gening)
 Typhoon Carla (1974) (4W)
 Tropical Storm Carla (1977) (11W, Luming)

Atlantic hurricane set index articles
Pacific typhoon set index articles